Thorgal: Curse of Atlantis, known in Europe as Thorgal: Odin's Curse, is a point-and-click adventure game developed by Cryo Interactive Entertainment and published by Le Lombard in 2002.

Gameplay
The player assumes the role of Thorgal, a mighty Viking warrior and descendant of Atlantis, who uncovers a magical artifact which allows him to see his own future. Caught between reality and a prophetic vision, Thorgal discovers a foretold future where his son dies. Thorgal sets out to change the future life for his son.

Thorgal is a comic book character created by Jean Van Hamme and Grzegorz Rosiński and published by Belgian publisher Le Lombard.

Reception
According to Lorraine Lue of DreamCatcher Interactive Europe, Thorgal was commercially unsuccessful, particularly in North America. She traced this problem to its visuals and its inclusion of action elements, which she believed had alienated DreamCatcher's audience.

References

External links 
 Thorgal: Curse of Atlantis at Microïds

2002 video games
Adaptations of works by Jean Van Hamme
Cryo Interactive games
Point-and-click adventure games
Science fantasy video games
Single-player video games
Thorgal
Video games about psychic powers
Video games about time travel
Video games based on comics
Video games about parallel universes
Video games set in the Viking Age
Video games with pre-rendered 3D graphics
Windows games
Windows-only games